The Sorrows of a Young Tangerian (Arabic title: Tanjawi, French title: Tangérois) is a 2013 Moroccan film directed by Moumen Smihi.

Synopsis 
The third part of a loosely autobiographical trilogy, the film chronicles Larbi Salmi's rebellious young adulthood during Morocco's early years of independence.

Cast 

 Mohammed Alami
 Younes Chakkour
 Helene Morguen
 Hamza Elbardai
 Othman Sellami
 Astrid Roos
 Najoua Kalyé
 Saïd Amel
 Azzelarab Kaghat

References

External links 
 

Moroccan drama films
2013 films